A sloboda was a kind of settlement in the history of the Old Russian regions Povolzhye, Central Russia, Belarus and Ukraine. The name is derived from the early Slavic word for "freedom" and may be loosely translated as "(tax-)free settlement". In modern Russia, the term is used to denote a type of a rural locality  in Kursk, Lipetsk, Nizhny Novgorod, Oryol, Rostov, Ryazan, Tula, and Voronezh Oblasts.

History
Often a sloboda was a colonization-type settlement in sparsely populated lands, particularly by Cossacks in Cossack Hetmanate, see "Sloboda Ukraine". Initially, the settlers of such sloboda were freed from various taxes and levies for various reasons, hence the name. Freedom from taxes was an incentive for colonization.

By the first half of the 18th century, this privilege was abolished, and slobodas became ordinary villages, shtetls, townlets, suburbs.

Some slobodas were suburban settlements, right behind the city wall. Many of them were subsequently incorporated into cities, and the corresponding toponyms indicate their origin, such as Ogorodnaya Sloboda Lane, Moscow (:ru:Переулок Огородная Слобода).

The Brockhaus and Efron Encyclopedic Dictionary relates that by the end of the 19th century a sloboda was a large village with more than one church, a marketplace, and volost administration, or a village-type settlement of industrial character, where the peasants have little involvement in agriculture.

The term is preserved in names of various settlements and city quarters. Some settlements were named just thus: "Sloboda", "Slobodka" (diminutive form), "Slabodka", "Slobidka" (Ukrainian).

Similar settlements existed in Wallachia and Moldavia, called slobozie or slobozia. The latter term is also the name of the capital city of Ialomița County in modern Romania, located in the region of Wallachia.

See also
Wola (settlement), a similar concept in Polish history
Lhota, a similar concept in Czech history
Royal free city

References

Types of populated places
Cossack Hetmanate
Geography of Russia
Geography of Romania
Geographic history of Ukraine